River Guard is a 2016 American independent crime film directed by Jim Klock and written by J. Davis. The film stars Brett Cullen, Eric Ladin, Stacia Crawford, Jeff Kober, Peter Jason and J. D. Evermore.

Plot 

Crime writer Sean Flynn returns home from New York after a long absence when authorities reopen an old murder case against Richard Adams for the alleged murder of his wife Sara Adams. In the last scene Chuck Flynn admits to his son, that he killed her by accident, when driving drunk.

Cast 
 Brett Cullen as Chuck Flynn
 Eric Ladin as Sean Flynn 
 Stacia Crawford as Nikki Wallace 
 J. D. Evermore as Banger
 Jeff Kober as Detective Mitchell 
 Peter Jason as Judge Sullivan
 Doug Burch as Richard Adams
 Aerli Austen as Susie Adams

Production 

The film was shot in Wilmington, North Carolina. The court house scenes were shot in the New Hanover County Courthouse.

References

External links 
 

2016 films
2016 crime films
American crime films
Films shot in North Carolina
Films set in North Carolina
2010s English-language films
2010s American films